The 1950 Yugoslav Second League season was the 4th season of the Second Federal League (Croatian: Druga savezna liga, Serbian: Друга савезна лига), the second level association football competition of SFR Yugoslavia, since its establishment in 1946.

Teams
A total of eleven teams contested the league, including five sides from the 1948–49 season, one club relegated from the 1948–49 Yugoslav First League and five sides promoted from the third tier leagues played in the 1948–49 season. The league was contested in a double round robin format, with each club playing every other club twice, for a total of 20 rounds. Two points were awarded for a win and one point for draws.

Sloga Novi Sad were relegated from the 1948–49 Yugoslav First League after finishing in the 9th place of the league table, while 10th placed Ponziana Trieste stopped competing in the Yugoslav League system. The five clubs promoted to the second level were 11 Oktomvri Kumanovo, Borac Zagreb, Kvarner, Napredak Kruševac and Željezničar Sarajevo.

League table

See also
1950 Yugoslav First League

  

Yugoslav Second League seasons
Yugo
2
Yugo
2